The Gauḍa Kingdom (Gāuṛ Rājya) or Shashankas, was a classic kingdom during the Classical period on the Indian subcontinent, which originated in the region of Bengal (modern-day West Bengal and Bangladesh) in 4th century CE or possibly earlier.

Location and extent
A Buddhist Mahāyāna Text Mañjuśrī-Mūlakalpa records the existence of Gauda Kingdom in Bengal before it was replaced by Gupta Empire in the 4th century. King Loka who was born in Vardhamāna (Bardhamān) is mentioned who must have ruled in the early 4th century CE.

King Shashanka is often attributed with creating the first separate political entity in a unified Bengal called Gauda. He reigned in 7th century, and  some historians place his rule approximately between 590 and 625. The Chinese monk, Xuanzang (Hiuen Tsang) travelled from the country of Karnasubarna to a region in the present-day state of Orissa ruled by Shashanka. There is mention of Pundravardhana being part of Gauda in certain ancient records. Not much is known about the early life of Shashanka. Historian D K Ganguly is reported to have concluded that he was a native of Magadha. The same source reports that the historian Padmanath Bhattacharya took Shashanka to be a son of Mahāsenagupta. R D Banerji concluded that he was descended from the Magadha Guptas. Nagendranath Basu has argued that Shashanka was the son / descendant of Raja Karnadeva, who founded the city of Karnasubarna in Bengal.

In some sources, Shashanka is described as a tribal leader of Bengal. Shashanka's name appears in multiple forms, including Śaśānka and Śaśānka-deva. The name is derived from Sanskrit, as another name for the Moon. Śaśānka-deva therefore loosely translates to Moon god. The Hindu god Shiva is also known as Shashank Sekhar as He holds the moon on his head. The Chinese monk Xuanzang's writings, he is mentioned as She-Shang-Kia. He is also called Śaśānka Narendragupta, which initially lent credence to the claim that he was descended from the later Guptas. In Sinha's Dynastic History of Magadha, the names 'Śaśānka' and 'Soma' are used interchangeably. Some historians believe that Shashanka began his career as a feudatory chief (maha samanta) under Mahasenagupta, of the Later Gupta Dynasty. And that after the death of Mahasenagupta, Shashanka drove the later Guptas and other prominent nobles out of the region and established his own kingdom with his capital at Karnasubarna. Other historians like Sailendra Nath Sen is of the opinion that Mahasenagupta - already under pressure from the Maukharis (for failing to provide adequate protection) - wouldn't have knowingly appointed Shashanka to such an important position. Middleton (2015) argues in a similar vein that Shashanka served as maha samanta to a Gauda king, possibly Jayanaga. Whether Shashanka was a feudatory under the Maukharis or the Guptas is not known. By 605 C.E. following Mahasenagupta's death, Shashanka had established what became known as the Gauda Kingdom. From there, he issued gold coins to celebrate his triumph, and came to be addressed as Maharajadhiraja (king of great kings). According to some sources the city of Gauda was founded by King Shankaladeva. He, originally, was a native of Kannauj. In the book, History of Hindostan (originally translated from the book Gulshan-i-Ibrahimi written by Firishta), it has been stated that Shankaladeva (Sinkol) was a native of Kannauj (Kinoge) and established the city of Gauda during the 8th century BC. Following his death, Shashanka was succeeded by his son, Manava, who ruled the kingdom for eight months. However Gauda was soon divided amongst Harshavardhana and Bhaskarvarmana of Kamarupa, the latter even managing to conquer Karnasuvarna.

Evidence is inconsistent regarding links of Gauda with the Rarh region. While Krishna Mishra (11th or 12th century), in his Prabodha-chandrodaya, mentions that Gauda Rashtra includes Rarh (or Rarhpuri) and Bhurishreshthika, identified with Bhurshut, in Hooghly and Howrah districts, the Managoli inscription of the Yadava king Jaitugi I distinguishes Lala (Rarh) from Gaula (Gauda).

According to Jain writers of the thirteenth and fourteenth centuries, Gauda included Lakshmanavati in present-day Malda district.

The Pala emperors were referred to as Vangapati (Lord of Vanga) and Gaudesvara (Lord of Gauda). Sena kings also called themselves Gaudesvara. From then Gauda and Vanga seem to be interchangeable names for the whole of Bengal.

See also

 Gauḍa (city)

References

Medieval Bengal
590 establishments
States and territories established in the 590s
626 disestablishments